Ann-Magrit Austenå (born 28 June 1961) is a Norwegian journalist and organizational leader. As of 2018 she is secretary-general of NOAS, the Norwegian Organisation for Asylum Seekers.

She was born in Oslo. She graduated as cand.mag. in sociology, social science and mass communication from the University of Oslo in 1985, and has been journalist for the newspapers Vårt Land and Dagbladet. She chaired the Norwegian Union of Journalists from 2003 to 2007.

References

1961 births
Living people
Journalists from Oslo
Dagbladet people
Trade unionists from Oslo
University of Oslo alumni